Open access to scholarly communication in Italy has grown since the early 2000s. During an academic conference in Messina in November 2004, Italian universities joined the Berlin Declaration on Open Access to Knowledge in the Sciences and Humanities, in Italy thereafter known as the "Declaration of Messina".

Timeline
 2004
 "Messina open access declaration issued."
 "PLEIADI (Portal for Italian Electronic Scholarly Literature in Institutional Archives) was developed and implemented by the interuniversity supercomputing consortia CASPUR and ... to provide a national platform to access digital contents deposited in the Italian open archives."
 2006
 " (CRUI) established a working group on open access" (OAWG).
 2013
 7 October: Law effected requiring "results of research, funded at least 50% with public funds and published in scholarly journals (whose frequency is at least biannual) should be open access."
 2015
 March: Associazione Italiana per la promozione della Scienza Aperta founded to promote open science.
 2019 
 The Ministry of Education, University and Research drafts a policy combining evaluation of grants to research institutions with a requirement to publish research outputs in open access mode.

See also

Internet in Italy
Education in Italy
Media of Italy
Copyright law of Italy
List of libraries in Italy
Science and technology in Italy
Open access in other countries

References

Further reading

External links
  ("National platform to access scholarly literature archived in Italian open repositories and published in Open Access Journals.") Launched in November 2004.

 Wikisource: Dichiarazione di Messina (Messina Declaration), 2004

Academia in Italy
Communications in Italy
Italy
Science and technology in Italy